The list of team that have participated in the NCAA Division II Football Championship playoffs. The NCAA Division II Football Championship playoffs began with eight teams in 1973 and expanded to include 16 teams in 1988, 24 teams in 2004, and 28 teams in 2015.

Current Division II members

Qualified teams
Teams in bold participated in the 2022 postseason.
Updated through November 13, 2022

Not yet qualified

 Teams in yellow are ineligible for the playoffs due to a transition to Division II.

Former NCAA Division II members
Former NCAA Division II teams that sponsored football at D-II level and had made at least one appearance in playoffs but had left NCAA Division II.

Defunct programs
Currently NCAA Division II teams that sponsored football at D-II level and had made at least one appearance in playoffs but dropped their football programs.

Notes

Program changes 
 Program has since joined Division I FBS.
 Program has since joined Division I FCS.
 Program has since joined NCAA Division I but has dropped football.
 Program has since joined Division III.

See also
 List of NCAA Division II football programs
 List of NCAA Division I FBS football bowl records
 List of NCAA Division I FCS playoff appearances by team
 List of NCAA Division III Football Championship appearances by team
 List of NAIA National Football Championship Series appearances by team

References

External links
 Past winners 

Lists of college football team records
Playoff Appearances